The 2023 CONCACAF Gold Cup Final is an upcoming soccer match to determine the winner of the 2023 CONCACAF Gold Cup. The match will be the 17th final of the Gold Cup, a quadrennial tournament contested by the men's national teams representing the member associations of CONCACAF and an invited guest to decide the champion of North America, Central America, and the Caribbean. The match will be held at SoFi Stadium in Inglewood, California, United States, on July 16, 2023, and will be contested by the winners of the semifinals.

Venue

The final will be held at SoFi Stadium in Inglewood, California, United States, located in the Los Angeles metropolitan area. It will be the first major international tournament to be played at the venue, which was built for the Los Angeles Chargers and Los Angeles Rams of the National Football League. The Los Angeles area has previously hosted Gold Cup matches six times, including four finals played at the Los Angeles Memorial Coliseum and two finals at the Rose Bowl. On October 27, 2022, CONCACAF announced that SoFi Stadium would be the host venue for the final. The venue will also host matches during the 2026 FIFA World Cup.

Match

Details

References

CONCACAF Gold Cup finals
2023 CONCACAF Gold Cup
Soccer in Los Angeles
CONCACAF Gold Cup Final
2023 in sports in California